Get Out of My Room is an album and short-form video featuring comedians Cheech & Chong, released in 1985. The opening track "Born In East L.A." and "I'm Not Home Right Now" were the only singles released for the album.

Following the album's release, Cheech left the duo in 1986 in order to focus on his mainstream acting career and while they have since reconvened, Get Out of My Room remains their last album to date.

Track listing

Side 1
"Born In East L.A."
"Dorm Radio I"
"I'm Not Home Right Now"
"Sushi Bar"
"Dorm Radio II"
"Love Is Strange"
"Dorm Radio III"

Side 2
"I'm A (Modern) Man"
"The Music Lesson"
"The Stupid Early Show"
"Warren Beatty"
"Juan Coyote"
"Radio News"
"Get Out Of My Room"

Get Out of My Room video 

In 1985 a 53-minute film was made. Get Out of My Room was presented in a mockumentary style akin to This Is Spinal Tap, The film written and directed by Cheech Marin. In the film, he and Tommy Chong are shown attempting to finish a "video album" for their novelty record Get Out of My Room. In between fake interview segments and behind the scenes footage, we are shown music videos for the songs "Get Out of My Room", "I'm Not Home Right Now", "Love Is Strange", and "Born in East L.A.". In the video's story, the duo find themselves overworked and over-budget in an attempt to finish the four music videos featured in the film. The video also features lively cameos from Cassandra Peterson (Elvira, Mistress of the Dark), Beverly D'Angelo, John Paragon, Evelyn Guerrero (who played "Donna" in three of their previous films), Playboy Playmate Alana Soares and her sister Leilani Soares.

In the "Get Out of My Room" music video, Cheech plays Ian Rotten, the egotistic control-freak leader of a British punk rock group, and Chong plays 'The Man', an American guitarist who plays for the group. Both have been set up in a gym to record the music video for their song. Several basketball players show up, and play a game in the background, despite Rotten's complaints. The two begin to pretend to play the song (With Ian lip-synching poorly and Man failing to synch up his actions with the recording). Patti Heid, Cheech's 2nd wife art directed the videos.

The song "Born in East L.A." became novelty hit and received regular airtime on MTV. "Born in East L.A." was later made into a film of the same name, Cheech Marin wrote, directed and starred in the film.

Get Out of My Room was released on DVD in the United Kingdom, but not in the United States, where it was only available on VHS. The album remained unavailable on compact disc until it was finally re-released in 2002. The movie was finally released in the United States on DVD in the Cheech and Chong Midnight Munchies Pack with Cheech and Chong's Next Movie and Born in East L.A. on October 13, 2015.

Charts

References

External links

1985 albums
1985 films
Cheech & Chong albums
1980s comedy albums